José María Pazo Torres (born 4 April 1964) is a Colombian former footballer who played as a goalkeeper.

Club career
Pazo played for a few clubs, including Atlético Junior.

International career
Pazo played for the Colombia national football team and was a participant at the 1994 FIFA World Cup.

References

External links

1964 births
Living people
People from Valledupar
Colombian footballers
Association football goalkeepers
Atlético Junior footballers
Independiente Medellín footballers
Categoría Primera A players
Colombia international footballers
1993 Copa América players
1994 FIFA World Cup players